Corstorphine/Murrayfield is one of the seventeen wards used to elect members of the City of Edinburgh Council. Established in 2007 along with the other wards, it currently elects three Councillors.

As its name suggests, the ward's territory is based around the suburban communities of Corstorphine and Murrayfield in the west of the city, also including Balgreen, Broomhall, Carrick Knowe, Ravelston and Roseburn, Saughtonhall, with four large open areas comprising two golf courses, Edinburgh Zoo and the playing fields surrounding Murrayfield Stadium. A minor boundary change in 2017 saw the loss of the Forrester and West Coates neighbourhoods but the addition of Wester Broom and Orchard Brae South (between Roseburn Footpath and Stewart's Melville College) – there was a slight increase in the population, which in 2019 stood at 24,192.

Councillors

Election results

2023 by-election

2022 election
2022 City of Edinburgh Council election

2017 Election
2017 City of Edinburgh Council election

2012 Election
2012 City of Edinburgh Council election

2007 Election
2007 City of Edinburgh Council election

References

External links
Listed Buildings in Corstorphine/Murrayfield Ward, City of Edinburgh at British Listed Buildings

Wards of Edinburgh
Corstorphine